Karen Cook McNally (1940 – December 20, 2014) was an American seismologist.

She was born in Clovis, California and received bachelor's (1971) and master's (1973) degrees and a PhD (1976) in geophysics from the University of California, Berkeley. McNally worked at the California Institute of Technology with Charles Francis Richter, creator of the Richter magnitude scale, and became part of the faculty at the University of California, Santa Cruz in 1981. She was director of the Richter Seismological Laboratory there and their instruments were able to capture high-quality recordings of the 1989 Loma Prieta earthquake. She founded the Institute of Tectonics and helped establish a seismology research program at the University.

McNally established a modern geophysical observatory and a national seismographic network in Costa Rica, and was able to improve that country's program for reducing earthquake hazards. She was awarded a medal by the National University of Costa Rica for her efforts.

She was a member of the board of directors for the Seismological Society of America and the Incorporated Research Institutions for Seismology and sat on the California Earthquake Prediction Evaluation Council. In 1982, she received the Richtmyer Memorial Award from the American Association of Physics Teachers.

She married at a young age and had two daughters; the couple divorced in 1966. She died at home in Davenport at the age of 74.

References 

American seismologists
1940 births
2014 deaths
American women geologists
20th-century American geologists
University of California, Berkeley alumni
University of California, Santa Cruz faculty
People from Clovis, California
20th-century American women scientists
Women geophysicists
American geophysicists
Fellows of the Seismological Society of America
21st-century American women